Pierre Strong Jr. (born December 10, 1998) is an American football running back for the New England Patriots in the National Football League (NFL). He played college football at South Dakota State.

Early life and high school
Strong grew up in Little Rock, Arkansas and graduated from John L. McClellan High School. As a junior, he rushed 2,248 yards and 30 touchdowns as McClellan advanced to the Class 5A state championship game. Despite his season ending injury that occurred at Little Rock McClellan's final drive of the 2016 regular game against Pulaski Academy, Strong rushed 1,423 total yards and scored 25 touchdowns during his senior year. Overall, Strong had totaled 4,268 rushing yards and scored 57 touchdowns over his final two seasons in McClellan. He was named a Landers Award finalist in his senior year due to his accomplishments.

Despite being offered football scholarships from very few D1 schools, Strong was ultimately offered a scholarship and recruitment by South Dakota State University as he made a verbal commitment in January 2017.

College career
Strong redshirted his true freshman season. As a redshirt freshman, he rushed for 1,116 yards and 11 touchdowns and was named the Missouri Valley Football Conference (MVFC) Freshman of the Year. Strong gained 1,018 yards and scored eight touchdowns on 143 carries during his redshirt sophomore season and was named first-team All-MVFC. As a redshirt junior, he rushed for 707 yards in the spring 2021 season, which was delayed from the fall due to the COVID-19 pandemic. As a redshirt senior, Strong rushed for 1,686 yards and 18 touchdowns, caught 22 passes for 150 yards, and also completed 4-of-4 pass attempts for 62 yards and four touchdowns.

Professional career

Strong was drafted by the New England Patriots with the 127th pick in the fourth round of the 2022 NFL Draft.

References

External links
 New England Patriots bio
South Dakota State Jackrabbits bio

Living people
American football running backs
South Dakota State Jackrabbits football players
Players of American football from Arkansas
Sportspeople from Little Rock, Arkansas
New England Patriots players
1998 births